Nematus is a genus of sawfly in the family Tenthredinidae. Some of its species, including Nematus leucotrochus, Nematus olfaciens and Nematus ribesii, eat the leaves of fruit bushes and trees, and can be serious pests.

See also
 List of Nematus species

References

Tenthredinidae
Agricultural pest insects
Sawfly genera